19th London Film Critics Circle Awards
4 March 1999

Film of the Year: 
 Saving Private Ryan 

British Film of the Year: 
 Lock, Stock and Two Smoking Barrels 
The 19th London Film Critics Circle Awards, honouring the best in film for 1998, were announced by the London Film Critics Circle on 4 March 1999.

Winners and nominees

Film of the Year
 Saving Private Ryan 
Boogie Nights
The Ice Storm
Titanic
The Truman Show

British Film of the Year
 Lock, Stock and Two Smoking Barrels 
The Butcher Boy
Elizabeth
The General
My Name Is Joe

Foreign Language Film of the Year
 Shall We Dance? • Japan
Funny Games • Austria

Director of the Year
Peter Weir – The Truman Show 
James Cameron – Titanic
Michael Haneke – Funny Games
Ang Lee – The Ice Storm
Steven Spielberg – Saving Private Ryan

British Director of the Year
John Boorman – The General 
Ken Loach – My Name Is Joe

Screenwriter of the Year
Andrew Niccol – The Truman Show and Gattaca 
Joel and Ethan Coen – The Big Lebowski
Matt Damon and Ben Affleck – Good Will Hunting
James Schamus – The Ice Storm
Neil LaBute – In the Company of Men

British Screenwriter of the Year
Guy Ritchie – Lock, Stock and Two Smoking Barrels 
Neil Jordan and Patrick McCabe – The Butcher Boy
John Boorman – The General
Paul Laverty – My Name Is Joe
Hossein Amini – The Wings of the Dove

Actor of the Year
Jack Nicholson – As Good as It Gets 
Matt Damon – Good Will Hunting, The Rainmaker and Saving Private Ryan
Robert Duvall – The Apostle
Tom Hanks – Saving Private Ryan
Kevin Kline – The Ice Storm and In & Out

Actress of the Year
Cate Blanchett – Elizabeth 
Joan Allen – The Ice Storm
Pam Grier – Jackie Brown
Helen Hunt – As Good as It Gets
Gwyneth Paltrow – Sliding Doors, Great Expectations and A Perfect Murder

British Actor of the Year
Brendan Gleeson – The General 
John Hurt – Love and Death on Long Island
Derek Jacobi – Love Is the Devil: Study for a Portrait of Francis Bacon
Peter Mullan – My Name Is Joe
Bill Nighy – Still Crazy

British Actress of the Year
Helena Bonham Carter – The Wings of the Dove 
Julie Christie – Afterglow
Minnie Driver – The Governess
Louise Goodall – My Name Is Joe
Kristin Scott Thomas – The Horse Whisperer
Kate Winslet – Titanic
Catherine Zeta-Jones – The Mask of Zorro

British Supporting Actor of the Year
Nigel Hawthorne – The Object of My Affection 
Daniel Craig – Love Is the Devil: Study for a Portrait of Francis Bacon
Christopher Eccleston – Elizabeth
Joseph Fiennes – Elizabeth
Anthony Hopkins – The Mask of Zorro, Amistad and The Edge
Vinnie Jones – Lock, Stock and Two Smoking Barrels
Adrian Lester – Primary Colors
Rufus Sewell – Martha, Meet Frank, Daniel and Laurence

British Supporting Actress of the Year
Kate Beckinsale – The Last Days of Disco 
Minnie Driver – Good Will Hunting 
Kathy Burke – Dancing at Lughnasa and Elizabeth
Natascha McElhone – The Truman Show, Mrs. Dalloway and Ronin

British Newcomer of the Year
Peter Mullen – My Name Is Joe 
Peter Howitt – Sliding Doors
Eamonn Owens – The Butcher Boy and The General
Jonathan Rhys-Meyers – Velvet Goldmine, The Disappearance of Finbar and The Governess
Guy Ritchie – Lock, Stock and Two Smoking Barrels

British Producer of the Year
Alison Owen, Tim Bevan, Eric Fellner – Elizabeth

Dilys Powell Award
Albert Finney
John Hurt

Lifetime Achievement Award
John Box
John Boorman

External links
IMDB
Official Website

1
1998 film awards
1998 in London
1998 in British cinema